Alenka Cuderman (born June 13, 1961) is a former Yugoslav/Slovenian handball player who competed in the 1984 Summer Olympics.

In 1984 she was a member of the Yugoslav handball team which won the gold medal. She played three matches including the final.

External links
profile

1961 births
Living people
Yugoslav female handball players
Slovenian female handball players
Handball players at the 1984 Summer Olympics
Olympic handball players of Yugoslavia
Olympic gold medalists for Yugoslavia
Olympic medalists in handball
Sportspeople from Kranj
Medalists at the 1984 Summer Olympics